354P/LINEAR, provisionally designated P/2010 A2 (LINEAR), is a small main-belt asteroid that was impacted by another asteroid sometime before 2010. It was discovered by the Lincoln Near-Earth Asteroid Research (LINEAR) at Socorro, New Mexico on 6 January 2010. The asteroid possesses a dusty, comet-like trail of debris that remained for nearly a decade since impact. This was the first time a small-body collision had been observed; since then, minor planet 596 Scheila has also been seen to undergo a collision, in late 2010. The tail is created by millimeter-sized particles being pushed back by solar radiation pressure.

Overview 

P/2010 A2 was discovered on 6 January 2010 by Lincoln Near-Earth Asteroid Research (LINEAR) using a 1-meter (36") reflecting telescope with a CCD camera.  It was LINEAR's 193rd comet discovery.  It has been observed over a 112-day arc of the 3.5 year orbit.  It appears to have come to perihelion (closest approach to the Sun) around the start of December 2009, about a month before it was discovered.

With an aphelion (furthest distance from the Sun) of only 2.6 AU, P/2010 A2 spends all of its time inside of the frostline at 2.7 AU. Beyond the frostline volatile ices are generally more common.  Early observations did not detect water vapor or other gases. Within less than a month of its discovery it was doubtful that the tail of P/2010 A2 was generated via active outgassing from sublimation of ices hidden beneath the crust.  Early modeling indicated that the asteroid became active in late March 2009, reached maximum activity in early June 2009, and eased activity in early December 2009.

Observations with the Hubble Space Telescope and the narrow angle camera on board the Rosetta spacecraft indicate that the dust trail seen was probably created by the impact of a small meter size object on the larger asteroid in February or March 2009, although it cannot be ruled out that the asteroid's rotation increased from solar radiation resulting in a loss of mass that formed a comet-like tail.

P/2010 A2 is likely about 150 meters (460 feet) in diameter. Even when it was discovered it was suspected of being less than 500 meters in diameter.

The orbit of P/2010 A2 is consistent with membership in the Flora asteroid family, produced by collisional shattering more than 100 million years ago.  The Flora family of asteroids may be the source of the Chicxulub (Cretaceous–Paleogene) impactor, the likely culprit in the extinction of the dinosaurs.

See also 
 493 Griseldis
 596 Scheila
 P/2016 G1 (PanSTARRS)

References

External links
 Orbital simulation from JPL (Java) / Horizons Ephemeris
 Image of Comet P/2010 A2 (Muler 12" Meade LX200)
 Suspected Asteroid Collision Leaves Odd X-Pattern of Trailing Debris (Hubble Space Telescope WFC3 2010 January 29 image)
 Hubblesite Videos (January 29 through May 29)
 NOAO/WIYN: New Camera at WIYN images an Asteroid with a Long Tail (NOAO 13-07 : 3 June 2013)
 

Active asteroids
0354
Small-asteroids collision

20100106